Aleksander Petrovich Reza Qoli Mirza Qajar (May 25, 1869 -?) – was a prince of Persia's Qajar dynasty, an Imperial Russian military leader and the commander of Yekaterinburg (1918), having the rank of Colonel (Polkovnik).

Biography
Alexander Petrovich Reza Qoli Mirza Qajar was born on May 25, 1869 in the Saint Petersburg Governorate. According to the track record, he was "the son of the Prince of Persia, a native of St. Petersburg Province and had the Orthodox religion."
In 1890–1893 he completed his military education at Vilnius Military School.

References
 Последный Есаул Конвоя Его Величества
 Азербайджанцы в Петербурге–Петрограде
 Сайт Виленского пехотного училища

1869 births
Russian military personnel of World War I
Aleksander
White movement people
Russian people of Iranian descent
Emigrants from the Russian Empire to Iran
White Russian emigrants to Iran
Year of death missing
People from Saint Petersburg Governorate
Bahmani family